Edmore Chirambadare (born 24 January 1992 in Gweru, Zimbabwe) is a left-footed Zimbabwean professional footballer who plays as a winger for Real Kings. Nicknamed "Spanner" by his teammates, he was mostly known for his goalscoring adroitness back in Zimbabwe.

The Gweru local sees Zimbabwean former footballer Peter Ndlovu as his main inspiration.

Early life
Born in Gweru, the former Takunda Primary and Mkoba 3 High School student was raised solely by his mother Georgina Kunene after the passing of his father in his early childhood.

Career

Youth

Aged 17, the national team player also represented Midlands Province in the Zimbabwe National Youth Games where he was spotted by Tsholotsho F.C. coach Lizwe Sweswe who identified him as someone he could build his team around. Lizwe ended up buying Chirmabadare in 2013.

Zimbabwe

The winger joined Zimbabwean lower-league side Zim Alloys in 2011 but was overlooked by the coach which chagrined him deeply. Begrudgingly, Chirmabadare opted to work as a barman for six months in his hometown of Gweru before proceeding to move to Gweru Pirates on a loan spell. Not long after, he was sold to Silo United before sealing a move to Tsholtsho F.C. of the Zimbabwe Division 1 where he scored 13 goals,(in his second year following a stint at Highlands F.C.) earning them automatic promotion. Owing to his form, Chicken Inn coach Joey Antipas decided to scout him in a match facing Black boots F.C. where he scored a brace. Because of his performance there, he was bought by Chicken Inn F.C. in 2015 and delivered 11 goals in his first season there, scoring three goals in his first five games and netting the fastest goal of the season on his debut in a 2-1 victory over Flame Lilly FC. As a result, he became the most sought-for player in the Zimbabwe Premier Soccer League at the time.

Kaizer Chiefs
Following a trial with the Soweto-based club, Chirambadare signed a three-year contract with the Amakhosi along with Zimbabwean Michelle Katsvairo in 2016, authoring his first goal in the quarter-final of the 2016 Telkom Knockout where Kaizer Chiefs lost on penalties to Free State Stars.

Although Chirambadare did not manage a league goal in his first seventeen appearances at Kaizer Chiefs, he adapted well to the club and cemented his place as a regular starter in the lineup and won the 2016-17 Kaizer Chiefs Most Improved Player award.

Back in 2016, the offensive player trialed for Bidvest Wits but he never made the transfer.

Personal life
While plying his trade for Chicken Inn, the Zimbabwean playmaker shared a house with teammate David Tenwanjira. A devout Christian, he was raised on the  Masowe Echishanu Apostolic Church before moving on to the Methodist Church.

His interests include pool, darts and chess.

His late father Peter and his cousins Stanley, Ernest, and Shepherd were all footballers.

Individual awards
 2016-17 Kaizer Chiefs Most Improved Player
 ZIFA Southern region Golden Boot(1): 2014

References

External links
 Sport24 Article
 Chirmabadare banking on confidence
 Makua calls on Kaizer Chiefs to show patience on Chirambadare
 

Association football wingers
1992 births
People from Gweru
Living people
Chicken Inn F.C. players
Kaizer Chiefs F.C. players
Real Kings F.C. players
South African Premier Division players
National First Division players
Zimbabwean footballers
Zimbabwean expatriate footballers
Zimbabwe international footballers
Zimbabwean expatriate sportspeople in South Africa
Expatriate soccer players in South Africa
Zimbabwe A' international footballers
2016 African Nations Championship players